Starks is an English surname. Notable people with the surname include:
Argalus Starks (1804–1870), American politician
Carol Starks, British actress
Duane Starks (born 1974), American football player
Edwin Chapin Starks (1867–1932), American ichthyologist
John Starks (basketball) (born 1965), American basketball player
John Starks (drummer) (1937–2018), American musician
Llewellyn Starks (born 1967), American long jumper
Max Starks (born 1982), American football player
P. J. Starks (born 1982), American filmmaker
Ricky Starks (born 1994), American wrestler
Scott Starks (born 1983), American football player

See also
Mack Starks, nickname for American musician Mack Linebaugh
 Tony Starks (born 1970), the pseudonym of American rapper Dennis Coles
Starks (disambiguation), other meanings
Stark (surname)

English-language surnames

fr:Starks